Papanino is a town in the Tavush Province of Armenia.

References 

Populated places in Tavush Province